Eudromaeosauria ("true dromaeosaurs") is a subgroup of terrestrial dromaeosaurid theropod dinosaurs. They were small to large-sized, feathered hypercarnivores (with diets consisting almost entirely of other terrestrial vertebrates) that flourished in the Cretaceous Period.

Eudromaeosaur fossils are known almost exclusively from the northern hemisphere. They first appeared in the early Cretaceous Period (early Aptian stage, about 124 million years ago) and survived until the end of the Cretaceous (Maastrichtian stage,  Ma). The earliest known definitive eudromaeosaur is the large dromaeosaurine Utahraptor ostrommaysi, from the Cedar Mountain Formation, dated to 124 million years ago. However, the earlier (143-million-year-old) fossils such as those of Nuthetes destructor and several indeterminate teeth dating to the Kimmeridgian stage may represent eudromaeosaurs.

Description
While other dromaeosaurids filled a variety of specialized ecological niches, mainly those of small predators or larger fish-eating forms, eudromaeosaurs functioned as large-bodied predators of often medium- to large-sized prey. Aside from their generally larger size, eudromaeosaurs are characterized by several features of the foot. First, differences existed in the positions of the grooves that anchored blood vessels and keratin sheathes of the toe claws. In primitive dromaeosaurids like Hesperonychus, these grooves ran parallel to each other on either side of the claw along its length. In eudromaeosaurs, the grooves were asymmetrical, with the inner one split into two distinct grooves and elevated toward the top of the claw, while the single outer groove remained positioned at the midline.

The second distinguishing characteristic of eudromaeosaurs is an expanded and enlarged "heel" on the last bone in the second toe (phalanx), which bore the enlarged, sickle-like toe claw. Finally, the first bone of the second toe also possessed an enlarged expansion at the joint, another adaptation relating to the unusually enlarged claw, and which helped the animal hold the claw high off the ground. Also unlike their more basal relatives, the sickle claw of eudromaeosaurs was sharper and more blade-like. In unenlagiines and microraptorines, the claw is broader at its base.

Classification
Eudromaeosauria was first defined as a node-based clade by Nick Longrich and Philip J. Currie in 2009, as the most inclusive natural group containing Dromaeosaurus, Velociraptor, Deinonychus, and Saurornitholestes, their most recent common ancestor and all of its other descendants. The various "subfamilies" have also been redefined as clades, usually defined as all species closer to the group's namesake than to Dromaeosaurus or any namesakes of other subclades.

The subgroups of Eudromaeosauria frequently shift in content based on new analysis, but typically consist of the following groups. For example, the subfamily Velociraptorinae has traditionally included Velociraptor, Deinonychus, and Saurornitholestes, and while the discovery of Tsaagan lent support to this grouping, the inclusion of Saurornitholestes is still uncertain. The Dromaeosaurinae are usually found to consist of medium- to giant-sized species, with generally box-shaped skulls (the other subfamilies generally have narrower snouts). A number of eudromaeosaurs have not been assigned to any particular subfamily, because they are too poorly preserved to be placed confidently in phylogenetic analysis (see section Relationships below).

Relationships
The below cladogram follows an analysis by Evans et al. in 2013. Their analysis used an updated version of the dataset originally compiled by Nick Longrich and Phil Currie to study dromaeosaurid relationships, and found a relatively traditional arrangement of eudromaeosaurian relationships.

See also

 Timeline of dromaeosaurid research

References

Dromaeosaurs